Veszprémi KKFT Felsőörs  is a Hungarian handball club from Veszprém, that plays in the  Nemzeti Bajnokság I, the top level championship in Hungary.

Crest, colours, supporters

Naming history

Kit manufacturers and Shirt sponsor
The following table shows in detail Veszprémi KKFT Felsőörs kit manufacturers and shirt sponsors by year:

Kits

Sports Hall information

Name: – Március 15. úti Sportcsarnok
City: – Veszprém
Capacity: – 2200
Address: – 8200 Veszprém, Március 15. u. 5.

Management

Team

Current squad 

Squad for the 2022–23 season

Technical staff
 Head coach:  Csaba Konkoly
 Assistant coach:  Nándor Fazekas
 Coach:  Dániel Kiss
 Fitness coach:  József Széles
 Masseur:  Gábor Nagy
 Club doctor:  Dr. András Szoboszlai

Transfers

Transfers for the 2022–23 season

Joining 

  Šimon Macháč (LP) from  SBS-Eger
  Tibor Balogh (GK) from  SBS-Eger
  Gábor Pulay (RB) from  SBS-Eger
  Balázs Molnár (LW) from  SBS-Eger
  János Stranigg (LB) from  NEKA
  Bence Vetési (CB) from  Kecskeméti TE
  Levente Szrnka (LP) from  Kecskeméti TE
  Marcell Ludmán (LB) from  Pick Szeged
  Dominik Gál (LP) from  HRK Gorica

Leaving 

  Ádám Borbély (GK) to  Ferencvárosi TC
  Gergő Fazekas (CB) to  Telekom Veszprém
  Huba Vajda (LP) to  Balatonfüredi KSE
  József Tóth (LP) (retires)
  Bálint Somogyi (LB) to  Polisportiva Cingoli
  Márton Tóth (CB) to  Ceglédi KKSE
  Máté Kurucz (RB) to  SBS-Eger

Previous Squads

Top Scorers

Honours

Recent seasons
Seasons in Nemzeti Bajnokság I: 1
Seasons in Nemzeti Bajnokság I/B: 5

European competition

EHF ranking

Former club members

Notable former players

 Ádám Borbély
 Benedek Éles
 Gergő Fazekas
 Viktor Melnyicsuk
 Zsolt Szobol
 Attila Tóth
 Huba Vajda
 Šimon Macháč (2022–)

Former coaches

References

External links
  
 

Hungarian handball clubs
Veszprém